A list of NCAA Division II college football seasons since splitting away in 1973. Prior to then, Division II schools participated in the NCAA's College Division.

Three Division Alignment (1973–1978)

Conference realignment
The Southland Conference, and all of its members, moved from Division II up to Division I in 1975 but returned to Division I-AA in 1982.
The Big Sky Conference, Mid-Eastern Athletic Conference, Ohio Valley Conference, Southwestern Athletic Conference, and Yankee Conference, and their respective members, moved from Division II into the newly founded Division I-AA in 1978.
After forming as a league in 1980, the Association of Mid-Continent Universities, and all of its members, moved from Division II up to Division I-AA in 1982.
The Pennsylvania State Athletic Conference, after competing as a Division III conference from 1973 to 1979, moved to Division II, along with all of its membership, in 1980.

Four Division Alignment (1978–present)

See also
List of NCAA Division I-A/FBS football seasons
List of NCAA Division I-AA/FCS football seasons
List of NCAA Division III football seasons
Harlon Hill Trophy

References